Gittenedouardia is a genus of air-breathing land snails, terrestrial pulmonate gastropod mollusks in the family Cerastidae.

Species
Species within the genus Gittenedouardia include:
 Gittenedouardia alycaeoides (Verdcourt, 1957)
 Gittenedouardia arenicola (Benson, 1856)
 Gittenedouardia athiensis (Connolly, 1925)
 Gittenedouardia burnayi (Dohrn, 1866)
 Gittenedouardia caffra (F. Krauss in L. Pfeiffer, 1848)
 Gittenedouardia carinifera (Melvill & Ponsonby, 1897)
 Gittenedouardia cockerelli (Pilsbry, 1933)
 Gittenedouardia conulina (E. von Martens, 1869)
 Gittenedouardia conulus (L. Reeve, 1849)
 Gittenedouardia dimera (Melvill & Ponsonby, 1901)
 Gittenedouardia drakensbergensis (E.A. Smith, 1877)
 Gittenedouardia eminula (Morelet, 1848)
 Gittenedouardia hanningtoni (G. B. Sowerby III, 1890)
 Gittenedouardia herbigrada (Pilsbry, 1919)
 Gittenedouardia junodi (Connolly, 1922)
 Gittenedouardia kaokoensis (Connolly, 1929)
 Gittenedouardia lourdeli (Bourguignat, 1889)
 Gittenedouardia maritzburgensis (Melvill & Ponsonby, 1893)
 Gittenedouardia mcbeaniana (Burnup, 1905)
 Gittenedouardia meridionalis (L. Pfeiffer, 1848)
 Gittenedouardia metula (E. von Martens, 1895) (synonym: Edouardia metula (E. von Martens, 1895))
 Gittenedouardia metuloides (E.A. Smith, 1899)
 Gittenedouardia nakuroensis (Dautzenberg, 1908)
 Gittenedouardia natalensis (F. Krauss in L. Pfeiffer, 1846)
 Gittenedouardia orbus (W. T. Blanford & H. F. Blanford, 1861)
 Gittenedouardia prestoni (Connolly, 1925)
 Gittenedouardia randalanai (Griffiths & Herbert, 2013)
 Gittenedouardia rufonigra (L. Reeve, 1849)
 Gittenedouardia sordidula (E. von Martens, 1897)
 Gittenedouardia spadicea (L. Pfeiffer, 1846)
 Gittenedouardia subeminula (Bourguignat, 1883)
 Gittenedouardia transvaalensis (Melvill & Ponsonby, 1893)
 Gittenedouardia tumida (J.S. Gibbons in J.W. Taylor, 1877)
 Gittenedouardia turricula (Preston, 1911)
 Gittenedouardia vesconis (Morelet, 1860)

References

 Bank, R. A. (2017). Classification of the Recent terrestrial Gastropoda of the World. Last update: July 16, 2017

External links
 Bank, R. A. & Menkhorst, H. P. M. G. (2008). Notes on the nomenclature of some land- and freshwater molluscs of the Seychelles, with consequences for taxa from Africa, Madagascar, India, the Philippines, Jamaica, and Europe. Basteria. 72(4/6): 93-110

Cerastidae